Abu al-Abbas Ahmad ibn Muhammad ibn al-Wannan (fl. Fez, died 1773) was a Moroccan poet. His fame was based on his poem al-Shamaqmaqiyya, a survey of traditional Arabic culture in which he described the customs of the early Arabs. He is said to have been a member of an Arab family from the Tuwāt in southern Algeria and Morocco. Ibn al-Wannan also described himself as Ḥimyari, and claimed descent from the Anṣār.

References

Bibliography 
E.J. van Donzel  Islamic Desk Reference p. 162, leiden: Brill, 1992 
GAL II, 615; suppl. II, 706

1773 deaths
People from Fez, Morocco
18th-century Moroccan people
18th-century Moroccan poets
Year of birth unknown

18th-century Arabs